The different styles of wrestling may be classified in various ways, such as:
 Loose style wrestling
 Belt wrestling

Styles of wrestling by technique
 :Category:Grappling hold
 Cornish wrestling throws

Historical styles

Important historical styles include: 

 Pankration – mixing boxing and wrestling, and a sport in the original Olympic Games 
 Greek wrestling
 Lancashire wrestling
 Devon wrestling

Modern wrestling by operation styles
In the modern era, styles of operating a wrestling match could be classified thus, although it is not a style of wrestling itself:

 Amateur sports
 Professional sports and Sports entertainment
Some styles exist or have existed in more than one of these three broad categories. Where this is the case and an article exists, it may appear in and be linked to from two or more of the lists below.

But this is not a classification by styles of wrestling. This is classification of its operation as a business.

Note particularly that the phrase professional wrestling normally refers to sports entertainment, but can also refer to the professional level of wrestling as a competitive sport.

Amateur competitive wrestling

 Two styles of wrestling have been included in the modern Summer Olympics:
 Greco-Roman wrestling
 Freestyle wrestling
 Shuai jiao – covering several jacket wrestling styles of China
 Folk wrestling (see also :Category:Folk wrestling styles)
Kurash
Kokh – Armenian type of wrestling
Khuresh
Mongolian wrestling
Oil wrestling – the national sport of Turkey
Schwingen – in Switzerland
Ssireum – the national sport of Korea
Collar-and-elbow
Cornish wrestling
Cumberland and Westmorland wrestling
Scottish Backhold
 Collegiate wrestling – in the United States
 Sambo (martial art) – in Russia
 Luta Livre – in Brazil, similar to Brazilian Jiu Jitsu, but without the gi
 Submission wrestling – even more similar to Brazilian Jiu Jitsu without the gi.
 Amateur pankration – a modern recreation of the ancient Olympic sport

Professional competitive wrestling

 Sumo – in Japan is the most popular form of competitive wrestling at a professional level
 Lucha libre – was once a competitive sport, but is now sports entertainment
 Catch-as-Catch-Can

Modern sports entertainment

The term sports entertainment was coined to describe the sports spectacles promoted by World Wrestling Entertainment (WWE). These matches are not competitive, but are a scripted and rehearsed entertainment. 

The rules are not always clear and are generally ignored in any case. The term is now used to describe all staged wrestling matches and similar versions of other sports.

In the context of sports entertainment, the term professional wrestling is used both to mean all staged forms of wrestling, and also more specifically for those of the particular style developed by WWE.  
 Professional wrestling – mainly in the USA but also in Japan
 King's Road style – in Japan
 Strong style – in Japan
 Lucha Libre – particularly in Mexico, but also in other Spanish-speaking countries
 Backyard wrestling – originated from Hardcore Wrestling which was created by ECW

See also:
 Kayfabe – the open secret that these matches are predetermined
 Professional wrestling promotion
 List of professional wrestling promotions
 Independent circuit

Organisations
 United World Wrestling – the governing body for Olympic wrestling
 WWE
 New Japan Pro-Wrestling – is by attendance and revenue the second largest sports entertainment organization in the world, behind WWE
 Consejo Mundial de Lucha Libre – is the world's oldest wrestling organization, specializing in the Lucha Libre style. Founded in Mexico City in 1933.
 :Category:Professional wrestling promotions

People

Amateur wrestling
 :Category:Sport wrestlers
 :Category:Cornish Wrestling Champions
 :Category:Wrestling coaches

Competitive professional wrestling
 :Category:Sumo people

Sports entertainment
 Jess McMahon and Toots Mondt, co-founders of WWE
 :Category:Professional wrestlers

See also

Boxing styles and technique
Comparison of karate styles
Comparison of kobudō styles
Hybrid martial arts
Styles of Chinese martial arts
Styles of Japanese martial arts

References

External links

Wrestling
Style